Kuşçulu is a village in the Görele district of Giresun province, Turkey.

Population

References

External links 
 Website

Villages in Giresun Province